Regular elections in Albania are mandated by the Constitution and legislation enacted by Parliament. The Parliament (Kuvendi) has 140 members elected for four-year terms. The electoral system is open list proportional representation. There are 12 multi-member constituencies corresponding to the country's 12 administrative regions. Within any constituency, parties must meet a threshold of 3 percent of votes, and pre-election coalitions must meet a threshold of 5 percent of votes.

This electoral system replaced a mixed-member system in November 2008. Under the old system, 100 members were elected directly in single member constituencies with approximately equal numbers of voters. 40 were elected from multi-name lists of parties or party coalitions according to their ranking. The total number of deputies of a party or a party coalition was to be, to the closest possible extent, proportional to the valid votes won by that party or coalition on the national scale in the first round of elections. Parties that received less than 2.5% and coalitions that received less than 4% of the valid votes on the national scale in the first round of elections did not benefit from the respective multi-name list.

The change was criticised by the smaller parties, but supported by the two main parties. It was considered an important step towards Albania's European integration. Other changes included limiting the prosecutor general's term to five years, forcing an early election in case of a no-confidence vote and reducing the majority required to elect the president from three-fifths to half the MPs.

The president is elected by parliament.

Albania has a multi-party system, with two or three strong parties and several other parties that are electorally successful.

History
On 31 March 1991, the first pluralist elections were held in the country. The elections were conducted with a clean majority system in 250 constituencies. 98.2% of voters took part in the voting. The participating parties registered a total of 1,074 candidates while 17 of the candidates were independent. The final election results declared the Labor Party the winner with 56.17% of the vote. The Democratic Party won 38.71% of the vote, the Republican Party 1.77%, the Omonia Organization 0.73%, the Agrarian Party 0.07% and the Veterans Committee 0.28%. With a 250-seat parliament, the results were translated into 169 deputies for the Labor Party, the Democratic Party 75 deputies, Omonia 5 deputies and the Veterans Committee 1 deputy. The Democratic Party achieved high results and received a larger number of deputies compared to the Labor Party in the main cities such as: Durrës (13 deputies out of 19 in total), Shkodër (16 out of 19 in total), Tirana (19 out of 29). Whereas in Krujë and Vlorë the number of deputies of the two major parties was equal. This was considered a great victory for the DP given that the communist party that had ruled the country for about 50 years still continued to have strong control over the population, especially in those living in rural areas and still doubting that the dictatorship would fall.

On 8 May  2000, the Albanian Parliament approved the Electoral Code only with the votes of the Socialists, which had an overwhelming majority in the assembly that emerged from the 1997 elections. The Democratic Party rejected the Electoral Code in its entirety due to the composition of the Central Election Commission (KQZ or CEC) of 6 members. They boycotted his approval in parliament even though he had attended most of the roundtables organized for the debate over the Electoral Code. According to the new Electoral Code, voting in Albania would be based on a mixed, majority-proportional electoral system. From where 100 deputies, in the 140-seat parliament, would be elected by majority vote from single-member constituencies, while 40 seats were filled by national multi-member lists of political parties in order to achieve a proportional approach between nationally received votes and deputies which represented a political party in the assembly. To win a proportional mandate, political parties had to cross the 2.5% electoral threshold, while coalitions had to cross the 4% threshold.

Latest election

By county

List of elections

Parliamentary elections  
This is a list of parliamentary elections in Albania from the year 1921 till present day. Direct presidential elections have not been held.

Local elections 
The candidates column lists only the number of candidates for mayor of the municipality. It does not include candidates for member of the municipal council.

See also
 Electoral calendar
 Electoral system

References

External links
Adam Carr's Election Archive
Parties and Elections
Real Time Elections Result June 2009